Bhavish Aggarwal (born 28 August 1985) is an Indian entrepreneur and co-founder of Ola Cabs and Ola Electric. Aggarwal was included in Time magazine's 100 Most Influential People of 2018.

Early life
Aggarwal was born and brought up in Ludhiana city, Punjab, in a Punjabi Hindu family. He completed a bachelor's degree in computer science and engineering at Indian Institute of Technology Bombay in 2008. He started his career with Microsoft Research India as a Research Intern and later got reinstated as an Assistant Researcher.

Career
He began his career with Microsoft, where he worked for two years, filed two patents and published three papers in international journals. In January 2011 he co-founded Ola Cabs with Ankit Bhati in Bengaluru.

Ola Cabs
The idea for a cab company struck Aggarwal when he had a bad experience with a taxi, which led him and Ankit Bhati to co-found Ola Cabs in 2010. Ola Cabs has become the largest network of personal transportation options within India and has emerged as the most popular choice for many consumers in 22 Indian cities.

In May 2020, Ola Cabs announced a huge layoff of around 5000 employees in a move to survive the economic repercussions of COVID-19. It had suffered an overwhelming loss of revenue by about 95%. In a webinar addressed to the students of Bennet University, Bhavish said that the COVID-19 pandemic was about to accelerate the innovations in technologies. He claimed that the markets might move towards more car rentals and subscription-based ownerships of cars.

In April 2022, An internal email to Ola employees was sent out, announcing that Bhavish Aggarwal would be stepping down from day-to-day operations of the company to focus on the future of Ola’s venture into electric vehicles and quick-commerce.

Awards 
 ET Awards, Richest of the year, 2017

References

Businesspeople from Ludhiana
1985 births
Living people
Ola Cabs
IIT Bombay alumni
Punjabi people
Marwari people